The 2011–12 Minnesota Timberwolves season was the 23rd season of the franchise in the National Basketball Association (NBA). In their first season with head coach Rick Adelman, the team finished the lockout-shortened season with a 26–40 record, nine wins above their previous season and finished in 12th place in the Western Conference. This season saw the debut of 2009 draftee Ricky Rubio, who was a contender for the Rookie of the Year Award until he tore his ACL and his lateral collateral ligament after colliding into Kobe Bryant during a game against the Los Angeles Lakers and was out for the rest of the season. Following the season, Brad Miller retired.

Key dates
 June 23: The 2011 NBA draft took place at Prudential Center in Newark, New Jersey
 December 26: The Timberwolves begin the regular season with a loss against the Oklahoma City Thunder.

Summary

NBA draft 2011

Roster

Pre-season
Due to the 2011 NBA lockout negotiations, the programmed pre-season schedule, along with the first two weeks of the regular season were scrapped, and a two-game pre-season was set for each team once the lockout concluded.

|- bgcolor="#ccffcc"
| 1
| December 17
| Milwaukee
| 
| Michael Beasley and Kevin Love(21)
| Kevin Love (15)
| Ricky Rubio (7)
| Target Center 15,013
| 1–0
|- bgcolor="ccffcc"
| 2
| December 21
| @ Milwaukee
| 
| Kevin Love (22)
| Kevin Love (16)
| Luke Ridnour (6)
| Bradley Center
| 2-0

Regular season

Standings

Record vs. opponents

Game log

|- bgcolor=#fcc
| 1
| December 26
| Oklahoma City
| 
| Michael Beasley (24)
| Kevin Love (12)
| Ricky Rubio (6)
| Target Center19,406
| 0–1
|- bgcolor=#fcc
| 2
| December 27
| @ Milwaukee
| 
| Kevin Love (31)
| Kevin Love (20)
| José Juan BareaRicky Rubio (4)
| Bradley Center17,352
| 0–2
|- bgcolor=#fcc
| 3
| December 30
| Miami
| 
| Kevin Love (25)
| Kevin Love (12)
| Ricky Rubio (12)
| Target Center19,356
| 0–3

|- bgcolor=#cfc
| 4
| January 1
| Dallas
| 
| Kevin Love (25)
| Kevin Love (17)
| Ricky Rubio (7)
| Target Center15,115
| 1–3
|- bgcolor=#cfc
| 5
| January 2
| San Antonio
| 
| Kevin Love (24)
| Kevin Love (15)
| Luke Ridnour (9)
| Target Center14,514
| 2–3
|- bgcolor=#fcc
| 6
| January 4
| Memphis
| 
| Kevin Love (27)
| Kevin Love (14)
| Ricky Rubio (10)
| Target Center17,404
| 2–4
|- bgcolor=#fcc
| 7
| January 6
| Cleveland
| 
| Kevin Love (29)
| Kevin Love (14)
| Luke Ridnour (6)
| Target Center16,943
| 2–5
|- bgcolor=#cfc
| 8
| January 8
| @ Washington
| 
| Kevin Love (20)
| Kevin Love (16)
| Ricky Rubio (14)
| Verizon Center13,095
| 3–5
|- bgcolor=#fcc
| 9
| January 9
| @ Toronto
| 
| Jose Barea (16)
| Kevin Love (14)
| Ricky Rubio (6)
| Air Canada Centre14,097
| 3–6
|- bgcolor=#fcc
| 10
| January 10
| Chicago
| 
| Luke Ridnour (22)
| Kevin Love (13)
| Ricky Rubio (12)
| Target Center19,356
| 3–7
|- bgcolor=#cfc
| 11
| January 13
| @ New Orleans
| 
| Kevin Love (34)
| Kevin Love (15)
| Ricky Rubio (9)
| New Orleans Arena14,295
| 4–7
|- bgcolor=#fcc
| 12
| January 14
| @ Atlanta
| 
| Kevin Love (30)
| Kevin Love (13)
| Ricky Rubio (12)
| Philips Arena13,135
| 4–8
|- bgcolor=#cfc
| 13
| January 16
| Sacramento
| 
| Kevin Love (33)
| Kevin Love (11)
| Luke Ridnour (9)
| Target Center16,159
| 5–8
|- bgcolor=#cfc
| 14
| January 18
| Detroit
| 
| Kevin Love (20)
| Kevin Love (17)
| Ricky Rubio (8)
| Target Center15,598
| 6–8
|- bgcolor=#cfc
| 15
| January 20
| @ L. A. Clippers
| 
| Darko Miličić (22)
| Kevin Love (14)
| Luke RidnourRicky Rubio (6)
| Staples Center19,492
| 7–8
|- bgcolor=#fcc
| 16
| January 21
| @ Utah
| 
| Ricky Rubio (17)
| Kevin LoveDerrick Williams (8)
| Ricky Rubio (11)
| EnergySolutions Arena19,911
| 7–9
|- bgcolor=#fcc
| 17
| January 23
| Houston
| 
| Kevin Love (39)
| Kevin Love (12)
| Ricky Rubio (12)
| Target Center16,924
| 7–10
|- bgcolor=#cfc
| 18
| January 25
| @ Dallas
| 
| Kevin Love (31)
| Kevin Love (11)
| Ricky Rubio (12)
| American Airlines Center20,150
| 8–10
|- bgcolor=#cfc
| 19
| January 27
| San Antonio
| 
| Kevin LoveRicky Rubio (18)
| Kevin Love (16)
| Ricky Rubio (10)
| Target Center16,699
| 9–10
|- bgcolor=#fcc
| 20
| January 29
| L. A. Lakers
| 
| Kevin Love (33)
| Kevin Love (13)
| Ricky Rubio (8)
| Target Center17,551
| 9–11
|- bgcolor=#cfc
| 21
| January 30
| @ Houston
| 
| Michael Beasley (34)
| Ricky Rubio (8)
| Ricky Rubio (11)
| Staples Center14,264
| 10–11

|- bgcolor=#fcc
| 22
| February 1
| Indiana
| 
| Kevin Love (21)
| Kevin Love (17)
| Ricky Rubio (6)
| Target Center15,017
| 10–12
|- bgcolor=#cfc
| 23
| February 3
| @ New Jersey
| 
| Nikola Peković (27)
| Nikola Peković (11)
| Ricky Rubio (10)
| Prudential Center15,069
| 11–12
|- bgcolor=#cfc
| 24
| February 4
| Houston
| 
| Kevin Love (25)
| Kevin Love (18)
| Ricky Rubio  (11)
| Target Center19,356
| 12–12
|- bgcolor=#cfc
| 25
| February 7
| Sacramento
| 
| Nikola Peković (23)
| Michael Beasley (14)
| Ricky Rubio (14)
| Target Center14,073
| 13–12
|- bgcolor=#fcc
| 26
| February 8
| @ Memphis
| 
| José Juan Barea (17)
| Nikola PekovićDerrick Williams (9)
| José Juan Barea (6)
| FedEx Forum13,287
| 13–13
|- bgcolor=#fcc
| 27
| February 10
| Dallas
| 
| Kevin Love (32)
| Kevin Love (12)
| Ricky Rubio (8)
| Target Center17,119
| 13–14
|- bgcolor=#fcc
| 28
| February 11
| New York
| 
| Kevin Love (32)
| Kevin Love (21)
| Ricky Rubio (8)
| Target Center20,232
| 13–15
|- bgcolor=#fcc
| 29
| February 13
| @ Orlando
| 
| Kevin Love (19)
| Kevin Love (15)
| Ricky Rubio (8)
| Amway Center18,846
| 13–16
|- bgcolor=#cfc
| 30
| February 15
| Charlotte
| 
| Kevin Love (30)
| Kevin Love (18)
| José Juan Barea (8)
| Target Center15,139
| 14–16
|- bgcolor=#cfc
| 31
| February 17
| @ Houston
| 
| Kevin Love (33)
| Kevin Love (17)
| Ricky Rubio (9)
| Toyota Center16,836
| 15–16
|- bgcolor=#cfc
| 32
| February 19
| Philadelphia
| 
| Ricky Rubio (22)
| Kevin Love (15)
| Ricky Rubio (5)
| Target Center18,759
| 16–16
|- bgcolor=#fcc
| 33
| February 20
| @ Denver
| 
| Kevin Love (22)
| Kevin Love (13)
| Luke Ridnour (6)
| Pepsi Center17,263
| 16–17
|- bgcolor=#cfc
| 34
| February 22
| Utah
| 
| José Juan Barea (22)
| Nikola Peković (12)
| Luke RidnourRicky Rubio (6)
| Target Center18,776
| 17–17
|- bgcolor=#cfc
| 35
| February 28
| @ L. A. Clippers
| 
| Michael BeasleyDerrick Williams (27)
| Kevin LoveRicky Rubio (7)
| Ricky Rubio (9)
| Staples Center19,243
| 18–17
|- bgcolor=#fcc
| 36
| February 29
| @ L. A. Lakers
| 
| Michael BeasleyMartell Webster (14)
| Anthony Randolph (9)
| Ricky Rubio (9)
| Staples Center18,997
| 18–18

|- bgcolor=#fcc
| 37
| March 1
| @ Phoenix
| 
| Kevin Love (23)
| Kevin Love (10)
| Luke Ridnour (8)
| US Airways Center15,071
| 18–19
|- bgcolor=#cfc
| 38
| March 3
| @ Portland
| 
| Kevin Love (42)
| Kevin Love (10)
| Ricky Rubio (12)
| Rose Garden20,644
| 19–19
|- bgcolor=#cfc
| 39
| March 5
| L. A. Clippers
| 
| Kevin Love (39)
| Kevin Love (17)
| Ricky Rubio (6)
| Target Center19,509
| 20–19
|- bgcolor=#cfc
| 40
| March 7
| Portland
| 
| Kevin Love (29)
| Kevin Love (16)
| José Juan Barea (7)
| Target Center17,118
| 21–19
|- bgcolor=#fcc
| 41
| March 9
| L. A. Lakers
| 
| Nikola Peković (25)
| Nikola Peković (13)
| Ricky Rubio (10)
| Target Center20,164
| 21–20
|- bgcolor=#fcc
| 42
| March 10
| New Orleans
| 
| Kevin Love (31)
| Kevin Love (16)
| Luke Ridnour (10)
| Target Center20,123
| 21–21
|- bgcolor=#cfc
| 43
| March 12
| @ Phoenix
| 
| Kevin Love (30)
| Nikola PekovićDerrick Williams (8)
| Luke Ridnour (9)
| US Airways Center14,568
| 22–21
|- bgcolor=#fcc
| 44
| March 15
| @ Utah
| 
| Gordon Hayward (26)
| Kevin Love  Derrick Favors (16)
| Luke Ridnour (13)
| EnergySolutions Arena18,053
| 22–22
|- bgcolor=#fcc
| 45
| March 16
| @ L. A. Lakers
| 
| Kevin Love (27)
| Kevin Love (15)
| Luke Ridnour (11)
| Staples Center18,997
| 22–23
|- bgcolor=#fcc
| 46
| March 18
| @ Sacramento
| 
| Kevin Love (21)
| Kevin Love (11)
| José Juan Barea (4)
| Power Balance Pavilion15,616
| 22–24
|- bgcolor=#cfc
| 47
| March 19
| @ Golden State
| 
| Kevin Love (36)
| Kevin Love (16)
| José Juan BareaLuke Ridnour (10)
| Oracle Arena19,596
| 23–24
|- bgcolor=#fcc
| 48
| March 21
| @ San Antonio
| 
| José Juan Barea (18)
| Kevin Love (12)
| José Juan Barea (11)
| AT&T Center18,581
| 23–25
|- bgcolor=#fcc
| 49
| March 23
| @ Oklahoma City
| 
| Kevin Love (51)
| Kevin Love (14)
| José Juan Barea (14)
| Chesapeake Energy Arena18,203
| 23–26
|- bgcolor=#cfc
| 50
| March 25
| Denver
| 
| Kevin Love (30)
| Kevin Love (21)
| Luke Ridnour (6)
| Target Center20,023
| 24–26
|- bgcolor=#fcc
| 51
| March 27
| @ Memphis
| 
| Kevin Love (28)
| Kevin Love (11)
| Luke Ridnour (5)
| FedEx Forum14,769
| 24–27
|- bgcolor=#cfc
| 52
| March 28
| @ Charlotte
| 
| Kevin Love (40)
| Kevin Love (19)
| Luke Ridnour (14)
| Time Warner Cable Arena10,540
| 25–27
|- bgcolor=#fcc
| 53
| March 30
| Boston
| 
| Kevin Love (22)
| Kevin Love (11)
| Luke Ridnour (8)
| Target Center19,356
| 25–28

|- bgcolor=#fcc
| 54
| April 1
| @ Portland
| 
| Kevin Love (26)
| Kevin Love (9)
| Luke Ridnour (6)
| Rose Garden20,359
| 25–29
|- bgcolor=#fcc
| 55
| April 2
| @ Sacramento
| 
| Kevin Love (23)
| Kevin Love (7)
| Brad MillerLuke Ridnour (6)
| Power Balance Pavilion12,279
| 25–30
|- bgcolor=#fcc
| 56
| April 4
| Golden State
| 
| Kevin Love (29)
| Kevin Love (12)
| José Juan Barea (8)
| Target Center17,161
| 25–31
|- bgcolor=#fcc
| 57
| April 7
| @ New Orleans
| 
| Kevin Love (29)
| Kevin Love (12)
| José Juan Barea (7)
| New Orleans Arena15,520
| 25–32
|- bgcolor=#fcc
| 58
| April 9
| Phoenix
| 
| Kevin Love (25)
| Kevin Love (13)
| José Juan BareaMalcolm Lee (5)
| Target Center17,274
| 25–33
|- bgcolor=#fcc
| 59
| April 11
| @ Denver
| 
| Anthony Randolph (28)
| Derrick Williams (8)
| José Juan Barea (15)
| Pepsi Center15,823
| 25–34
|- bgcolor=#fcc
| 60
| April 12
| L. A. Clippers
| 
| Nikola Peković (17)
| Michael Beasley (10)
| José Juan Barea (11)
| Target Center16,016
| 25–35
|- bgcolor=#fcc
| 61
| April 14
| Oklahoma City
| 
| Michael Beasley (26)
| Nikola Peković (13)
| José Juan Barea (10)
| Target Center19,552
| 25–36
|- bgcolor=#fcc
| 62
| April 16
| @ Indiana
| 
| José Juan Barea (14)
| Derrick Williams (10)
| José Juan Barea (9)
| Bankers Life Fieldhouse11,845
| 25–37
|- bgcolor=#fcc
| 63
| April 17
| Memphis
| 
| José Juan Barea (28)
| Nikola Peković (11)
| José Juan Barea (8)
| Target Center16,709
| 25–38
|- bgcolor=#cfc
| 64
| April 19
| @ Detroit
| 
| Nikola Peković (23)
| Anthony Randolph (10)
| José Juan Barea (12)
| The Palace of Auburn Hills12,458
| 26–38
|- bgcolor=#fcc
| 65
| April 22
| Golden State
| 
| Nikola Peković (19)
| Nikola Peković (16)
| José Juan Barea (12)
| Target Center15,872
| 26–39
|- bgcolor=#fcc
| 66
| April 26
| Denver
| 
| José Juan Barea (20)
| Nikola Peković (10)
| José Juan Barea (5)
| Target Center14,824
| 26–40

Player statistics

Regular season

|- align="center" bgcolor=""
| 
| 41 || 11 || 25.2 || .400 || .371 || .776 || 2.8 || 5.7 || .5 || .0 || 11.3
|- align="center" bgcolor=""
| 
| 47 || 7 || 23.1 || .445 || .376 || .642 || 4.4 || 1.0 || .4 || .4 || 11.5
|- align="center" bgcolor=""
| 
| 51 || 4 || 19.1 || .404 || .324 || .800 || 1.9 || .6 || .5 || .2 || 6.1
|- align="center" bgcolor=""
| 
| 65 || 64 || 22.6 || .398 || .314 || .706 || 2.7 || .9 || .5 || .7 || 6.0
|- align="center" bgcolor=""
| 
| 19 || 0 || 12.8 || .390 || .200 || .824 || 1.4 || 1.6 || .4 || .2 || 3.3
|- align="center" bgcolor=""
| 
| 55 || 55 ||style=|39.0 || .448 || .372 || .824 ||style=|13.3 || 2.0 || .9 || .5 ||style=|26.0
|- align="center" bgcolor=""
| 
| 29 || 23 || 16.3 || .454 ||  || .432 || 3.3 || .6 || .3 || .9 || 4.6
|- align="center" bgcolor=""
| 
| 15 || 1 || 9.7 || .333 ||style=|.467 || .833 || 1.3 || 1.6 || .3 || .1 || 2.3
|- align="center" bgcolor=""
| 
| 47 || 35 || 26.9 ||style=|.564 ||  || .743 || 7.4 || .7 || .6 || .7 || 13.9
|- align="center" bgcolor=""
| 
| 34 || 5 || 15.2 || .470 || .000 || .762 || 3.6 || .6 || .4 ||style=|1.0 || 7.4
|- align="center" bgcolor=""
| 
| 53 || 53 || 33.0 || .440 || .322 ||style=|.891 || 2.7 || 4.8 || 1.1 || .3 || 12.1
|- align="center" bgcolor=""
| 
| 41 || 31 || 34.2 || .357 || .340 || .803 || 4.2 ||style=|8.2 ||style=|2.2 || .2 || 10.6
|- align="center" bgcolor=""
| 
| 51 || 0 || 17.3 || .390 || .248 || .745 || 3.0 || .4 || .4 || .4 ||  4.1
|- align="center" bgcolor=""
| 
| 47 || 26 || 24.3 || .423 || .339 || .792 || 3.6 || .9 || .7 || .4 || 6.9
|- align="center" bgcolor=""
| 
|style=|66 || 15 || 21.5 || .412 || .268 || .697 || 4.7 || .6 || .5 || .5 || 8.8
|}

Awards and records
 Ricky Rubio was named Western Conference Rookie of the Month for December – January and earned an NBA All-Rookie First Team selection.
 Kevin Love earned an All-NBA Second Team selection.
 Kevin Love scored a franchise record 51 points in a double overtime loss against the Oklahoma City Thunder on March 23.

All-Star
 Kevin Love participated in his second All-Star game as a reserve for the West in the 2012 NBA All-Star Game and won the Three-Point Shootout.
 Ricky Rubio and Derrick Williams participated in the Rising Stars Challenge. Williams also participated in the Slam Dunk Contest.

Injuries and disciplinary actions
 Brad Miller underwent surgery on his left knee during the offseason and returned on January 29.
 On December, Malcolm Lee underwent surgery to repair a torn meniscus and was out for two months.
 Martell Webster had surgery on his back in December and returned to practice with the team in mid-January.
 Kevin Love earned a two game suspension after stepping over Luis Scola during a game against the Houston Rockets on February 4.
 Ricky Rubio tore his ACL during a game against the Los Angeles Lakers on March 9 and missed the remainder of the season.

Transactions

Overview

Trades

Free agents

Many players signed with teams from other leagues due to the 2011 NBA lockout. FIBA allows players under NBA contracts to sign and play for teams from other leagues if the contracts have opt-out clauses that allow the players to return to the NBA if the lockout ends. The Chinese Basketball Association, however, only allows its clubs to sign foreign free agents who could play for at least the entire season.

See also
2011–12 NBA season

References

Minnesota Timberwolves seasons
Minnesota Timberwolves
2011 in sports in Minnesota
2012 in sports in Minnesota